The 2012 Dutch Figure Skating Championships took place between 17 and 18 December 2011 in Tilburg. Skaters competed in the disciplines of men's singles and ladies' singles on the senior and junior level, and pair skating for the junior level.

Senior results

Men

Ladies

External links
 2011–12 results at archief.knsb.nl (Archived 2013-07-13)
 2011–12 results at schaatsen.nl

Dutch Figure Skating Championships
Dutch Figure Skating Championships, 2012
2011 in figure skating
2012 in Dutch sport